Victor Glaentzlin (born 23 April 1998) is a French professional footballer who plays as a centre-forward for  club Nancy.

Career
Glaentzlin's career began with Sochaux. He firstly featured for the club's reserve team, making his debut on 28 May 2016 in a home defeat to Jura Sud. In total, he made nine appearances without scoring in 2015–16 and 2016–17. In his third campaign, 2017–18, Glaentzlin netted twelve goals in twenty fixtures; including his career first versus Selongey on 19 August 2017. In July 2018, Glaentzlin was promoted into Sochaux's first-team squad after being an unused substitute for their 2018–19 Ligue 2 opener against Grenoble, signing a three-year contract. A week later, on 3 August 2018, Glaentzlin made his first-team debut during a defeat to Valenciennes.

In June 2020, Glaentzlin agreed the termination of his Sochaux contract and signed for Le Mans.

In January 2022, Glaentzlin has his contract terminated and joined Créteil.

After a trial, Glaentzlin signed with Nancy on 19 October 2022.

Career statistics

References

1998 births
People from Guebwiller
Sportspeople from Haut-Rhin
Footballers from Alsace
Living people
French footballers
Association football forwards
FC Sochaux-Montbéliard players
Le Mans FC players
US Créteil-Lusitanos players
AS Nancy Lorraine players
Championnat National players
Championnat National 2 players
Championnat National 3 players
Ligue 2 players